Up is the eleventh studio album by American rock band R.E.M., released on October 26, 1998, by Warner Bros. Records. It was the band's first album without drummer Bill Berry, who retired from the group in October of 1997. In his place, R.E.M. used session drummers like Joey Waronker and Barrett Martin, as well as programming drum machines. The band has said that the album probably would have sounded much the same with Berry, as initial rehearsals with him had commenced, but his departure almost “broke” them and "hung over" the resulting recordings.

Details

Up saw R.E.M. move into electronic music-influenced territory after delivering New Adventures in Hi-Fi in 1996. Ending a 10-year relationship with co-producer Scott Litt, the band engaged the production assistance of Pat McCarthy, who was assisted on most tracks by engineer Nigel Godrich, Radiohead's producer. The single "Daysleeper" became a Top 10 UK hit, and "Lotus", The Beach Boys-influenced "At My Most Beautiful" and "Suspicion" were also released as singles.

"There are certain things I set out to do," Michael Stipe noted. "Rough ideas that I wanted to play around with. One of them was the religious-spiritual versus science-technology-modern-age. There are several songs on the record that, to me, address that. I don't know how other people are going to take them. It's taking off a little bit from 'Undertow' and 'New Test Leper', with the freedom of 'E-Bow the Letter' and 'Country Feedback' – songs that just come out. What I really wanted was more of that automatic, unconscious stuff… greatly inspired by Patti Smith and various others… Bert Downs said the record's about people falling down and getting back up again. He said there's a lot of that imagery. I'm like, 'Really?'"

Breaking with a tradition that stretched back to the band's 1983 debut, Murmur, Stipe elected to have his complete lyrics included in Up'''s CD booklet, a practice he would maintain on all subsequent R.E.M. studio albums. "[Mike Mills] was reading the lyrics," he explained, "and he said, 'These are really great – we should print them on the record sleeve.' It was a really good night and there were eight or nine songs on the wall. I said, 'Yeah, we will'… I thought it was a nice way of saying that we are a different band now."

R.E.M. subsequently admitted that they came close to breaking up while recording the album.

Sales and critical receptionUp reached number 3 in the U.S. (with 16 weeks on the Billboard 200) and #2 in the UK, but didn't have the staying power of the band's previous  albums, and thus had the band's lowest sales in years. "The things that we have to do creatively for the band may not be the most commercial things," Mike Mills observed. "That isn't the point. The point is to keep it fresh and interesting and alive."

"It will certainly sound strange to those who only own Automatic for the People and repeat-play the hits," wrote Danny Eccleston in a 4-star review for Q. "Conversely, anyone who has a healthy number of R.E.M. records – let's say four – and plays them regularly, should manage to listen to Up without his head exploding or tossing herself off a tall building or any of the weird things people are meant to do when faced with music they don't quite understand. This is R.E.M. after all. We couldn't even hear the lyrics until album five."

Although R.E.M. initially intended not to tour for the album, after many successful promotional concerts upon the album's release, the band quickly arranged a four-month arena tour of Europe and America during the summer of 1999. As of March 2007, Up has sold 664,000 units in the U.S.

In 2005, Warner Bros. Records issued an expanded two-disc edition of Up which includes a CD, a DVD-Audio disc containing a 5.1-channel surround sound mix of the album done by Elliot Scheiner, and the original CD booklet with expanded liner notes.

Accolades
In 1999, Nude as the News ranked the album at number 74 in its list of "The 100 Most Compelling Albums of the Decade". That same year, Australian magazine Juice ranked it at number 38 in its list of the "100 Greatest Albums of the '90s". In 2005, journalist Jude Rogers included the album in The Words list "Hidden Treasure: Great Underrated Albums of Our Time", whose inductions were chosen by celebrities. It also appeared in at least 22 magazine lists of the greatest albums of 1998.

Track listing
All songs by Peter Buck, Mike Mills and Michael Stipe, except "Hope" by Buck, Mills, Stipe and Leonard Cohen.Upside"Airportman" – 4:12
"Lotus" – 4:30
"Suspicion" – 5:36
"Hope" – 5:02
"At My Most Beautiful" – 3:35
"The Apologist" – 4:30
"Sad Professor" – 4:01
"You're in the Air" – 5:22Downside'''
"Walk Unafraid" – 4:31
"Why Not Smile" – 4:03
"Daysleeper" – 3:40
"Diminished" – 6:01
Includes a hidden track entitled "I'm Not Over You" starting at 5:00, with Stipe soloing on acoustic guitar, after the song's conclusion.
"Parakeet" – 4:09
"Falls to Climb" – 5:06

Notes
Cohen was not directly involved in the writing of "Hope" but was given a writing credit by the band due to similarities in melody and lyrical pattern to his "Suzanne".

Studio B-sides
Two non-album tracks from the Up sessions appeared as single-only releases, as well as alternate versions of four album tracks.

"Emphysema" – 4:21
"Surfing the Ganges" – 2:25
"Why Not Smile" (Oxford American version)
"Sad Professor" (live in the studio)
"Suspicion" (live in the studio) (Toast Studios, San Francisco, 1998 – "Lotus" single)
"Suspicion" (live in the studio) (Ealing Studios, 29-10-1998 – "Suspicion" single)
"Lotus" (Weird Mix)

Personnel
Peter Buck – guitar, bass guitar, keyboards, drums, percussion
Mike Mills – bass guitar, keyboards, guitar, backing vocals
Michael Stipe – lead vocals, guitar

Additional personnel
Nigel Godrich – engineering
Barrett Martin – drums, percussion
Pat McCarthy – production
Scott McCaughey – keyboards, percussion
Joey Waronker – drums, percussion

Charts

Weekly charts

Year-end charts

Certifications and sales

References

1998 albums
Albums produced by Michael Stipe
Albums produced by Mike Mills
Albums produced by Peter Buck
R.E.M. albums
Warner Records albums
Albums produced by Pat McCarthy (record producer)
Electronica albums by American artists